Paul Andrew Ingle (born 22 June 1972) is a British former professional boxer who competed from 1994 to 2000. He held multiple championships at featherweight, most notably the IBF title from 1999 to 2000, and the IBO title in 2000. At regional level he held the European, British, and Commonwealth titles between 1997 and 1999. As an amateur, Ingle represented Great Britain at the 1992 Summer Olympics, reaching the second round of the flyweight bracket.

Amateur career
Ingle was a member of the 1992 British Olympic team and competed in the flyweight division. In the first round he defeated Alexander Baba of Ghana by 9–7, but lost 12–13 in the second round to eventual gold medallist Choe Chol-su of North Korea. He won the 1991 Amateur Boxing Association British flyweight title, when boxing out of the Scarborough ABC.

Professional career
Ingle made his professional debut on 23 March 1994, scoring a third-round knockout over Darren Noble. On 11 January 1997, he stopped Colin McMillan in eight rounds to win his first regional championship, the British featherweight title. Later that year, on 11 October, Ingle defeated Jon Jo Irwin by eighth-round corner retirement to win the Commonwealth featherweight title. Ingle completed the regional trifecta when he won the European featherweight title on 26 September 1998, stopping Billy Hardy in eight rounds.

First world title challenge

By the time Ingle challenged for his first world title against WBO featherweight champion Naseem Hamed, he had won 21 consecutive fights without a loss. During the entrances for their fight, Ingle was kept waiting in the ring for six minutes. Angered by this, he and his trainer Steve Pollard went back to the dressing room and only returned after Hamed had finally made his own entrance. In the opening round of the fight, Ingle was knocked down and barely made it out of the round following an onslaught of punches by Hamed. A body shot floored Ingle again in the sixth, but with twenty seconds remaining he emerged unscathed. In rounds nine and ten, Ingle had some success by bloodying Hamed's nose. A third knockdown in the eleventh ended Ingle's challenge, as referee Joe Cortez deemed him unable to continue as he stood up on shaky legs.

IBF featherweight champion
Despite this first career loss, Ingle received another world title opportunity in his next fight, on 13 November 1999. He went on to defeat IBF featherweight champion Manuel Medina by unanimous decision, albeit suffering a knockdown in the twelfth and final round. In his first defence of the title, Ingle travelled to the United States for the first time and fought on the undercard of Lennox Lewis vs. Michael Grant. Facing him was former two-weight world champion Junior Jones, who held the IBO featherweight title. In an action-packed fight which was close on the judges' scorecards, Ingle was knocked down in round nine, but rallied back in dramatic fashion to stop Jones in the eleventh.

Retirement and life after boxing
Ingle's boxing career ended on 16 December 2000, losing both the IBF and IBO titles to Mbulelo Botile. The fight had undergone several postponements due to Ingle sustaining injuries in training and being unable to make the 126 lbs featherweight limit. After suffering a knockdown in round eleven, Ingle went down again in the twelfth and did not rise for several minutes. He was stretchered out of the ring and hospitalised for a blood clot on the brain, spending four weeks in intensive care before recovering. A boxing gym, the Paul Ingle Boxing Academy, has since opened in his honour, in Hull.

Professional boxing record

References

External links

English male boxers
Boxers at the 1992 Summer Olympics
Olympic boxers of Great Britain
1972 births
Living people
Sportspeople from Scarborough, North Yorkshire
International Boxing Federation champions
English Olympic competitors
International Boxing Organization champions
World featherweight boxing champions
Flyweight boxers
Commonwealth Boxing Council champions
European Boxing Union champions
British Boxing Board of Control champions